Sandrine Mainville (born March 20, 1992) is a Canadian competition swimmer who specializes in the freestyle. She won a bronze medal in the 2015 World Aquatics Championships in the 4 x 100 m mixed freestyle in Kazan, Russia. Mainville was also part of the 2015 Pan American Games champion 4 x 100 m freestyle relay team for Canada in Toronto.

Mainville competed for Canada's Olympic team at the 2016 Summer Olympics. She swam as part of Canada's relay team in the women's 4 x 100 m freestyle event. The final saw Canada swimming against the powerhouse Australia and United States team, Canada would finish behind them while fending off the Netherlands for bronze. Mainville swam with teammates Penelope Oleksiak, Taylor Ruck, Michelle Williams and Chantal van Landeghem.

See also
List of Olympic medalists in swimming (women)
List of World Aquatics Championships medalists in swimming (women)
List of Commonwealth Games medallists in swimming (women)

References

1992 births
Living people
Canadian female freestyle swimmers
World Aquatics Championships medalists in swimming
Pan American Games gold medalists for Canada
Swimmers at the 2016 Summer Olympics
Medalists at the 2016 Summer Olympics
Olympic bronze medalists for Canada
Olympic bronze medalists in swimming
Olympic swimmers of Canada
Commonwealth Games medallists in swimming
Commonwealth Games bronze medallists for Canada
Medalists at the FINA World Swimming Championships (25 m)
Pan American Games medalists in swimming
People from Boucherville
Swimmers at the 2015 Pan American Games
Swimmers at the 2014 Commonwealth Games
Universiade bronze medalists for Canada
Universiade medalists in swimming
Medalists at the 2013 Summer Universiade
Medalists at the 2015 Pan American Games
Medallists at the 2014 Commonwealth Games